Ligament of epididymis may refer to:

 Inferior ligament of epididymis
 Superior ligament of epididymis